Santa Clara–Great America station (called Great America station by ACE) is a train station in Santa Clara, California.  It hosts Amtrak's Capitol Corridor trains and Altamont Corridor Express (ACE) trains.  The station is close to Levi's Stadium and California's Great America. Amtrak service to Santa Clara began on May 21, 1993.

Of the 75 California stations served by Amtrak, Great America was the 20th-busiest in FY2019, boarding or detraining an average of about 533 passengers daily.

Transit connections
Santa Clara Valley Transportation Authority (VTA) provides connecting shuttles to employers in Sunnyvale, Santa Clara, Milpitas, and North San Jose.

References

External links 

Great America – ACE

Santa Clara-Great America – USA RailGuide (TrainWeb)
Great America Station – VTA

Amtrak stations in Santa Clara County, California
Altamont Corridor Express stations in Santa Clara County, California
Santa Clara Valley Transportation Authority bus stations
Railway stations in the United States opened in 1993
Buildings and structures in Santa Clara, California